Long Live the Sullied is a historical (mythological) novel written by Gaurav Sharma. It is the sequel to God of the Sullied and concludes The Sullied Warrior Duology. The book is narrated in a point-of-view manner where central characters from God of the Sullied tell their story using back stories and sweeps. The novel focuses mostly on characters like Maha-Purohit, Pundir and Acharya Virbhadra.

Publication
The first edition of Long Live the Sullied was published in January 2020 by Think Tank Books, a Delhi-based publishing house. Hindi translation of the book by the author came out in September 2020 as Mahanayak Eklavya.

References 

2020 Indian novels
Hindu mythology in popular culture
Indian English-language novels
2020 fantasy novels